was a Japanese printmaker of the sōsaku-hanga school. He was born in Tokyo and graduated from Nihon University in 1932.  In 1943, he graduated from the Western-style painting division of the Tokyo School of Fine Arts. He created his first print in 1946, and joined the Bijutsu Bunka Kyokai (a group of abstract and surrealist artists) the same year. He also studied Nagase Yoshi (1891–1978), an artist of the Sōsaku-hanga school. In 1963, he became a member of the Nihon Hanga Kyokai (Japanese Print Association).

He is best known for his totally abstract prints with broad areas of rich dense color.

References
 Blakemore, Frances, Who's Who in Modern Japanese Prints, New York, John Weatherhill, 1976, 192.
 Merritt, Helen and Nanako Yamada.  (1995). Guide to Modern Japanese Woodblock Prints, 1900–1975. Honolulu: University of Hawaii Press.	; ;  OCLC 247995392.
 Smith, Lawrence, Modern Japanese Prints 1912–1989, London, British Museum, 1994.
 Robertson, Ronald G., Contemporary Printmaking in Japan, Tokyo, Zokeisha, and New York, Crown, 1965.

Japanese printmakers
Sosaku hanga artists
1911 births
1984 deaths
Nihon University alumni